Avasara Kalyanam is a 1972 Indian Tamil-language comedy film, directed by V. T. Thyagarajan and produced by Subalakshmi Movies. The film script was written by Bala Murugan. The film stars Jaishankar and Nagesh playing lead roles, with Vanisri, Rama Prabha and V. K. Ramasamy in supporting roles. It was released on 29 June 1972.

Plot 

Friends Sekar and Ramu come to Madras for employment. Their money is looted. Ramu cheats a rich girl by acting as rich and marries her. Sekar tells the truth to Ramu's wife. So Ramu becomes an enemy to Sekar. Ramu separates Sekar and his lover. How the pairs are reunited is the story.

Cast 
 Jaishankar as Sekar
 Nagesh as Raghu
 Vanisri as Advocate Vasanthi
 Rama Prabha as Kamala
 V. K. Ramasamy as Ranganathan
 S. Rama Rao as Street Thief
 M. R. R. Vasu as Robbery Gang leader
 I. S. R. as Kamla's Manager
 Vijayachandrika as Meena
 A. Veerappan in Cameo Appearance
 V. R. Thilagam in Cameo Appearance

Soundtrack 
Music was composed by T. R. Pappa and lyrics were written by Kannadasan.

References

External links 
 

1970s Tamil-language films
1972 comedy films
1972 films
Films scored by T. R. Pappa
Indian black-and-white films
Indian comedy films